Montreal River may refer to:

Rivers

Canada
 Montreal River (Algoma–Sudbury, Ontario), a tributary of Lake Superior
 Montreal River (Timiskaming District), a tributary of the Ottawa River
 Montreal River (Saskatchewan)

United States
 Montreal River (Michigan), a river in the Keweenaw Peninsula
 Montreal River (Wisconsin–Michigan), along the Wisconsin-Michigan border

Places 
 Montreal River, Ontario

See also 
 Montreal (disambiguation)
 St. Lawrence River, the main river on which the city of Montreal is situated	
 Rivière des Prairies, the other river that adjoins Montreal